W22FA-D (channel 34) is a television station licensed to Mayaguez, Puerto Rico and serving Western Puerto Rico. The station is owned by TV Red Puerto Rico. The station's transmitter is located at Cerro Canta Gallo in Aguada.

Digital television

Digital channels
W22FA-D's digital signal is multiplexed:

References

External links

22FA-D
Low-power television stations in the United States